The Samar Seva Star is an Indian medal awarded to both Armed Forces personnel and civilians in recognition of service during the Indo-Pakistani War of 1965. The award was established on 11 February 1967.  One of the Medal goes to Ranchordas Pagi

Design

Medal 
The Medal is in the form of a five pointed star with vevelled rays, made of tamnbac bronze, 40 mm across with one point uppermost to which is fitted a ring for the ribbon. On the obverse, in the centre it has the State Emblem superimposed a circular band (2mm in width and 20 mm in diameter at its outer edges) surrounding the State Emblem and broken at the top by the heads of the lions. On this band has the inscription” 1965” in raised letters. The reverse of the medal is plain.

Ribbon 
The ribbon is red, dark blue and light blue in colour, the width of the colour being 12 mm, 8 mm and 12 mm respectively sub-divided into equal parts by 2, 1 and 2 narrow vertical stripes.

See also 

 Awards and decorations of the Indian Armed Forces

References 

Military awards and decorations of India